The House of Elders, also known as the Guurti, is the upper house of the Parliament of Somaliland. It has 82 members, representing traditional leaders. The House of Elders is mandated with considering bills proposed by the lower house of the parliament, the Somaliland House of Representatives.

Somaliland National Charter of 1993 established bicameral legislature. It was at a national gathering of clan elders at the 1993 conference in Boorama that delegates assigned the Guurti the role of peacemaker and upper house of the legislature. The term of office for the House of Elders is six years, but it has never been re-elected since it was founded in 1993.

Speakers
Sheikh Yusuf Ali Sheikh Madar, 1993 - July 2004, died in office
Suleiman Mohamoud Adan, August 2004 – Present

See also
 History of Somaliland
 Legislative branch
 List of national legislatures

References

External links
 Somaliland law

Somaliland
Government of Somaliland
House of Elders (Somaliland)
1993 establishments in Somaliland